The 1952–53 season was Chelsea Football Club's thirty-ninth competitive season.

Table

References

External links
 1952–53 season at stamford-bridge.com

1952–53
English football clubs 1952–53 season